is a Japanese politician and was member of the House of Representatives for the Japanese Communist Party. He retired from his House of Representatives seat at the 2014 general election.

1945 births
Living people
Politicians from Hokkaido
Members of the House of Representatives (Japan)
Japanese Communist Party politicians
21st-century Japanese politicians